Adeev and Ezra Potash (pronounced Poe-tash) professionally known as The Potash Twins are American identical twin musicians and television personalities from Omaha, Nebraska. The twins have hosted several TV shows on Food Network, Bravo TV and Travel Channel. They have performed with John Legend, Diplo, Snoop Dogg, Lil Baby, Jon Batiste, Robert Glasper, Major Lazer and Wynton Marsalis.

Early life and career 

Born on October 18, 1993, the twins grew up in Omaha, Nebraska, and attended Westside High School. Their father is a former director of the Anti-Defamation League Texas and current CEO of the Jewish Federation of Omaha. They took an early interest in food thanks to their mother, who traveled abroad for work and bring back some dishes.

While in Omaha, Ezra and Adeev performed for Warren Buffett and were asked to perform on several occasions for his Berkshire Hathaway Shareholders meeting. The twins were discovered by Wynton Marsalis in Lincoln, Nebraska, in 2008 and helped them apply to music conservatories in New York City. Adeev studied under Dizzy Gillespie protégé, Jon Faddis, at SUNY Purchase. With a full ride scholarship, his twin Ezra attended Manhattan School of Music in New York City to study bass trombone.

In 2012, the duo's first album, Twintuition, was released on Amazon, iTunes and Spotify. The name of the album is a reference to the supposely extrasensory perception and communication shared only between twins. As explained by themselves during a conference, the two brothers are a good musical duo, especially in jazz improvisation, because they started music at the same time and comunicate with each other since they are borned. Two years laters, the twins were nominated for Best Jazz for the Omaha Entertainment and Arts Awards. They became co-artistic directors at the Love's Jazz & Arts Center in Omaha.

In 2015, their second and eponymous album The Potash Twins, reached #9 on the iTunes Jazz chart. The next year, Ezra and Adeev participated in a TV competition show in China where they represented the United States. They received second place in this Chinese version of America's Got Talent.

The brothers are the proteges of celebrity chef and TV personality Andrew Zimmern. Zimmern has been the executive producer of their television shows to date. From 2017 to 2018, the series Southern Road Trip with The Potash Twins follows Adeev and Ezra Potash on a culinary and cultural journey through the American South.

In the next following couple of years, with Beats + Bites the Potash Twins introduce their famous collaborators to their food-forward world, bringing them along to experience the best eats on the road. Jazz musicians and foodies, the "Potash Twins" take viewers along as they meet artists, master chefs and Bravo celebrities. Among the guests, there were pairing like jazz artist Wynton Marsalis with Top Chef Michael Voltaggio and hip hop artist Smino with Top Chef judge Tom Colicchio. It is one of the fist television show to look into the intersection of music and food.

Their 2019 single Snap! featured the pianist Robert Glasper and singer Grace Weber. The actor Terry Crews starred in the associated clip. They have written and composed music for the Emmy Award winning shows RuPaul's Drag Race, RuPaul's Drag Race UK and Sherman's Showcase. In 2021, throughout ten episodes of Takeout Twins, the Twins cook dishes such as margherita pizza, pad thai and butter chicken for guests such as Joel McHale, Rob Riggle, Sheila E., Musiq Soulchild, Andrew Zimmern.

During the COVID-19 pandemic, the Potash Twins decided to settle down in Palm Springs, California to finish their latest album. With Hornography, which means study of horn music, released in 2022, the Potash Twins try to answer the question where do horns fit. They decided to incorporate spoken word moments on their music from some of their mentors Terry Crews, chef Andrew Zimmern, Vanderpump Rules actress Katie Maloney, Bob Saget, and also musically features Grammy Award winners Robert Glasper, Cory Wong, and Jazz Cartier. Bob Saget recorded his part before his death at age 65 in January. In 2018, Adeev and Ezra had a family member diagnosed with the autoimmune disease scleroderma. It is the same disease that took the life of Saget's older sister Gay in 1994. Saget helped them during this period. A portion of the album proceeds are going to the Scleroderma Research Foundation in his honor.

Television shows

Discography

Honors 

 : 
Awarded the rank of Nebraska Admiral by Governor Pete Ricketts in 2016. 
Named the Cultural Ambassadors of the State of Nebraska by proclamation in 2019.
 :
'Honorary Texans' by order of Governor Rick Perry in 2006.

References

External links 

 
 
 

Year of birth missing (living people)
Living people
Manhattan School of Music
Music of Omaha, Nebraska
American jazz trombonists
Male trombonists
American jazz trumpeters
Male trumpeters
Jazz-blues trumpeters
Food Network chefs
Jewish American musicians
American jazz horn players
Bravo (American TV network) original programming
American television composers
Male television composers
American television personalities